Iraqi Australians are Australian citizens who identify themselves to be Iraqi descent.
Since the 1991 Gulf War, thousands of Iraqis have found refuge in Australia. The total of population is estimated to be as high as 95,000. Australia's Iraqi-born population includes Arabs, Assyrians, Kurds, Armenians, Mandeans, Turkmens and Jews.

The first year in which the Australian Census of Population and Housing recorded the Iraq-born separately was 1976, when the population was 2,273. By 1986, the population had risen to 4,516. By the end of the Gulf War in 1991, it numbered 5,186, mainly in New South Wales and Victoria.

Many recent arrivals have entered Australia under the Humanitarian programme. The Gulf War and the quelling of uprisings of the Shi'a and the Kurds in Iraq resulted in a large increase in the number of Iraqis coming to Australia after 1991. There were 28,760 Iraq-born people in Australia at the 2001 Census, making up 0.6 per cent of the overseas-born population.

History

Iraqi-born Victorians were first identified in the Victorian census in 1976, when 189 people were recorded. Within five years the community had almost tripled to 408, and by 1991 had increased to 603. Most Iraqis had escaped hardships caused by the eight-year Iran–Iraq War, which ended in 1988.

The outbreak of the Gulf War in 1991 led a large number of people to flee Iraq into the neighbouring countries. Some refugees lived in processing camps for up to five years before being accepted into Australia under the Special Humanitarian Program. During this period the visas of around 400 Iraqis living in Australia were extended until the end of the Gulf War.

Iraqi immigration to Australia peaked between 1992 and 1995, with the Iraq-born population in Victoria increasing to 3,492 by 1996. By 2001 this community had increased a further 74% to 6,091 people. Most recent Iraqi immigrants have arrived under the Family and Skilled Migration categories. Some Iraqis have sought refugee status after arrival in Australia, and have been detained pending processing.

Today the Iraq-born community in Australia is culturally diverse, with settlers from many ethnic and cultural backgrounds including Arabs, Assyrians, Kurds, Turkomans, Mandaeans. Although Islam is the dominant religion in Iraq, only 29% of the Iraq-born immigrants living in Victoria are Muslim; 68% are Christian and who are mostly Assyrian.

Nearly half of the Iraqi community speaks Arabic at home; only 3% speaks English, reflecting the number of recent immigrants in the community. Over half of Iraq-born Victorians are aged under 35, and only 12% are aged over fifty. Of those in the workforce, both men and women are most commonly employed as labourers and related workers within the manufacturing industry, while nearly a quarter are employed in professional positions. The community is supported by organisations such as the Australian Iraqi Forum several religious or cultural associations.

Iraqi Australians
Oren Ambarchi, an Iraqi Jewish musician
Faisal Faisal, athlete
Don Hany (born 1975), actor (known for his role as Theo Rahme in White Collar Blue)
Ali Abbas Al-Hilfi, footballer born in Iraq who plays for Newcastle Jets
Toba Khedoori, artist
Ninos Khoshaba Assyrian politician and former member of Parliament in New South Wales
Brikha Nasoraia, scholar
Andrew Rohan, Member of the New South Wales legislative Assembly representing the district of Fairfield
Osamah Sami, actor
Mario Shabow, Assyrian football player for the Central Coast Mariners FC in the Hyundai A-League.

See also

Arab diaspora
Assyrian Australians
Mandaean Australians
Lebanese Australians
Syrian Australians
Iranian Australians
Turkish Australians

References

External links
 Arab Council Australia
 Arabic Broadcasting Service Australia
 Australian Arabic Entertainment Directory
 Australia Arab Chamber of Commerce and Industry
 Australian Arabic Council
 The Council for Australian-Arab Relations (CAAR)
 Fadi Jabbori, Liverpool Champion
 Fadi Jabbori
 Australian Iraqi forum